2-Ethylanthraquinone is an organic compound that is a derivative of anthraquinone. This pale yellow solid is used in the industrial production of hydrogen peroxide (H2O2).

Production
2-Ethylanthraquinone is prepared from the reaction of phthalic anhydride and ethylbenzene: 
C6H4(CO)2O  +  C6H5Et  →   C6H4(CO)2C6H3Et  +  H2O. 
Both phthalic anhydride and ethylbenzene are readily available, being otherwise used in the large-scale production of plastics.

Uses
Hydrogen peroxide is produced industrially by the anthraquinone process which involves using 2-alkyl-9,10-anthraquinones for hydrogenation. Many derivatives of anthraquinone are used but 2-ethylanthraquinone is common because of its high selectivity. The hydrogenation of the unsubstituted ring can reach 90% selectivity by using 2-ethylanthraquinone. Hydrogenation follows the Riedl-Pfleiderer, or autoxidation, process:

The hydrogenation of 2-ethylanthraquinone is catalyzed by palladium. Hydrogenation produces both 2-ethylanthrahydroquinone and tetrahydroanthraquinone. The tetrahydro derivative of 2-alkylanthraquinone is easily hydrogenated but is more difficult to oxidize.  The formation of the tetrahydro derivative can be suppressed through the selection of catalysts, solvents, and reaction conditions. Some suggested solvent mixtures are polyalkylated benzenes and alkyl phosphates or tetraalkyl ureas, trimethylbenzenes and alkylcyclohexanol esters, and methylnaphthalene and nonyl alcohols.

References

Anthraquinones